Cumbre Tunnel served Bosques de Chihuahua, a logging railroad in Copper Canyon, Chihuahua, Mexico. In 1914 the tunnel was obstructed by a hijacked train which was set afire. A replacement tunnel had to be constructed east of the former tunnel.

References

Tunnels in Mexico
Railway tunnels in North America
Buildings and structures in Chihuahua (state)
Rail infrastructure in Mexico